Synchytrium fragariae is a species of chytrid fungus in the Synchytriaceae family. It is a plant pathogen infecting strawberries.

References 

Fungal strawberry diseases
Chytridiomycota
Fungi described in 1949